Krummerne, or The Crumbs, is a Danish film series about the family Krumborg and particularly the boy 'Krumme' (Laus Høybye). They are loosely based on Thøger Birkeland's popular children's book series.

The first film in the series, the eponymous Krummerne, was theatrically released on 4 October 1991. Despite lukewarm reviews, the film was a commercial success with over 850,000 cinema admissions, becoming one of the most watched films of all time within Denmark. Notable filming took place in Kongens Lyngby and Charlottenlund.

Films

 Krummerne (The Crumbs) – 1991
 Krummerne 2 - Stakkels Krumme (Krummerne 2 - Poor Krumme) – 1992
 Krummerne 3 - Fars gode idé (Krummerne 3 - Father's good idea) – 1994
 Krummerne - Så er det jul igen (Krummerne - Then it's Christmas again) – 2006
 Krummerne - alt på spil (Krummerne - all at stake) – 2014

Television series

Krummernes Jul was released as a 'TV Christmas calendar' series broadcast on TV 2 throughout the month of December 1996 in the lead up to Christmas.

Cast

References

1991 films
1990s adventure comedy films
1990s children's comedy films
Danish adventure films
Danish children's films
Danish comedy films
Films about bank robbery
Films about children
Films about families
Films about friendship
Films based on Danish novels
1991 comedy films
Films directed by Sven Methling